Papoušek (feminine Papoušková) is a Czech surname meaning "parrot". Notable people with the surname include:

 Jaroslav Papoušek (1920–1996), Czech film director and screenwriter
 Petr Papoušek (born 1977), Czech footballer

Czech-language surnames